"The Real Thing" is a song by English band ABC, released as the second single from their fifth studio album, Up (1989).

The song peaked at No. 68 on the UK Singles Chart, their lowest charting single there since "Vanity Kills" in 1986.

Critical reception
On its release, Lisa Tilston of Record Mirror wrote, "ABC seem to have gone full circle, with the beginning of this sounding just like 'The Look of Love' set to a dance beat. Fair, but not their best."

Track listing
 UK 7" Single
"The Real Thing"
"The Greatest Love of All"

Charts

References

External links
 

ABC (band) songs
1989 singles
Songs written by Mark White (musician)
Songs written by Martin Fry
PolyGram singles
1989 songs